Simone Lunadoro or Lunadori (died 1610) was a Roman Catholic prelate who served as Bishop of Nocera de' Pagani (1602–1610).

Biography
On 17 June 1602, Simone Lunadoro was appointed during the papacy of Pope Clement VIII as Bishop of Nocera de' Pagani.
On 11 August 1602, he was consecrated bishop by Camillo Borghese, Cardinal-Priest of San Crisogono, with Guglielmo Bastoni, Bishop of Pavia, and Valeriano Muti, Bishop of Bitetto, serving as co-consecrators. 
He served as Bishop of Nocera de' Pagani until his death in 1610.

While bishop, he was the principal co-consecrator of Louis de Salignac de La Mothe-Fénelon, Bishop of Sarlat (1603).

References

External links and additional sources
 (for Chronology of Bishops) 
 (for Chronology of Bishops) 

17th-century Italian Roman Catholic bishops
Bishops appointed by Pope Clement VIII
1610 deaths